Estefanía Álvarez Piedrahita (born 25 August 1994) is a Colombian synchronized swimmer. She competed in the women's duet at the 2016 Summer Olympics.

She represented Colombia at the 2020 Summer Olympics.

References

1994 births
Living people
Colombian synchronized swimmers
Synchronized swimmers at the 2016 Summer Olympics
Synchronized swimmers at the 2020 Summer Olympics
Olympic synchronized swimmers of Colombia
Synchronized swimmers at the 2017 World Aquatics Championships
Artistic swimmers at the 2019 Pan American Games
Pan American Games competitors for Colombia
Artistic swimmers at the 2019 World Aquatics Championships
Synchronized swimmers at the 2015 Pan American Games
Sportspeople from Medellín
21st-century Colombian women